Cerro San Antonio is a town and municipality of the Colombian Department of Magdalena. Founded on June 13, 1750 by Fernando de Mier y Guerra near the Magdalena River. The Libertador Simon Bolivar visited this town on May 23, 1813 during the War of Independence of Colombia from Spain.

References

External links
 Cerro San Antonio official website

  

Municipalities of Magdalena Department